LaOtra ("TheOther") is the second television channel of the Radio Televisión Madrid public broadcasting network in the Community of Madrid, Spain. Launched in 2001, the channel broadcast a range of cultural programming including music and art. After a restructuring in 2006, it now also broadcasts children's programming, news and information from Madrid, history documentaries, sport, film and entertainment programming. It airs 24 hours a day in the Spanish language through DTT and other services, aired through analogue on UHF channel 40 until 30 June 2009.

External links 
 

Television stations in the Community of Madrid
Mass media in Madrid
FORTA
Television channels and stations established in 2001
2001 establishments in Spain